Eugenie… The Story of Her Journey into Perversion is a 1970 British sexploitation horror film directed by Jesús Franco, and starring Maria Rohm, Marie Liljedahl, Jack Taylor, and Christopher Lee. A modern-day adaptation of the Marquis de Sade's book Philosophy in the Bedroom (1795), the film follows a teenage girl who, after accepting an invitation to vacation on island with a woman and her brother, instead finds herself at the center of a series of disturbing sexual experiments.

Eugenie… The Story of Her Journey into Perversion marked the second of Franco's de Sade-themed films after Marquis de Sade: Justine (1969). It has often been confused with his later and more explicit Eugenie de Sade (filmed in 1970, released 1973), an adaptation of de Sade's short story "Eugénie de Franval" (1800) which starred Soledad Miranda, as both films are often referred to simply as Eugenie. To complicate matters further, the director went on to make a second adaptation of Philosophy in the Bedroom, entitled Eugenie (Historia de una perversión), in 1980.

Cast

Production
Christopher Lee replaced George Sanders in the film

Release
The film opened theatrically in Los Angeles, California on 5 August 1970.

Home media
Anchor Bay Entertainment released Eugenie… The Story of Her Journey into Perversion on DVD in the United Kingdom. It was subsequently released on DVD in North America by Blue Underground in 2002. Blue Underground released the film again in a in 2015 in a three-disc limited edition set (featuring Blu-ray and DVD editions of the film, as well as a soundtrack CD), followed by a standalone Blu-ray release in 2020.

See also
 Marquis de Sade in popular culture

Notes

References

Sources

Further reading

External links
 

1970 films
1970s erotic films
BDSM in films
British exploitation films
British horror films
Films based on works by the Marquis de Sade
Films about the Marquis de Sade
Films based on French novels
Films directed by Jesús Franco
Films set on islands
British sexploitation films
1970s British films